Guitar Noir is the tenth album by Steve Hackett, released in 1993.  On this record, he started turning to a much darker guitar sound, yet still retaining the fluidity he has become known for.

Track listing (UK Version)
"Sierra Quemada" (Steve Hackett) – 5:19
"Take These Pearls" (Hackett, Aron Friedman) – 4:14
"There Are Many Sides to the Night" (Hackett) – 7:23
"In The Heart of the City" (Hackett) – 4:35
"Dark As The Grave" (Hackett, Friedman) – 4:38
"Lost in Your Eyes" (Hackett, Dave 'Taif' Ball, Julian Colbeck, Hugo Degenhardt) – 4:56
"Little America" (Hackett, Ball, Colbeck, Degenhardt) – 4:55
"Like An Arrow" (Hackett) – 2:51
"Theatre of Sleep" (Hackett) – 3:04
"Walking Away From Rainbows" (Hackett) – 3:10
"Paint Your Picture" (Hackett) – 2:58
"Vampyre with a Healthy Appetite" (Hackett) – 5:30
"Tristesse" (Friedman) – 4:02
 1997 remastered bonus tracks
"Sierra Quemada" (demo) (Hackett) – 4:31
"Take These Pearls" (rough mix) (Hackett, Friedman) – 4:11
"In The Heart of the City" (original version) (Hackett) – 4:19
"Vampyre with a Healthy Appetite" (demo) (Hackett) – 4:41

The original (1993) version of the CD did not include the track "Theatre of Sleep".

Track listing (US Version)
"Lost in Your Eyes" (Hackett, Ball, Colbeck, Degenhardt) – 4:56
"In The Heart of the City" (Hackett) – 4:35
"Sierra Quemada" (Hackett) – 5:19
"Vampyre with a Healthy Appetite" (Hackett) – 5:30
"Take These Pearls" (Hackett, Friedman) – 4:14
"Little America" (Hackett, Dave 'Taif' Ball, Colbeck, Degenhardt) – 4:55
"There Are Many Sides to the Night" (Hackett) – 6:55
"Walking Away From Rainbows" (Hackett) – 3:10
"Like An Arrow" (Hackett) – 2:51
"Dark As The Grave" (Hackett, Friedman) – 4:38
"Paint Your Picture" (Hackett) – 2:58
"Tristesse" (Friedman) – 4:02
Cassandra (Hackett) – 3:42 (unlisted song featuring Brian May of Queen recorded in 1986)

Personnel (on UK Version)
Steve Hackett – guitar, vocals (2, 3, 4, 5, 6, 7, 8, 9, 11, 12), stepp (3, 10, 11), noises off (3), harmonica (6, 7, 12), string arrangements (8), rainstick (11)
Julian Colbeck – keyboards (1, 4, 6, 7, 12), backing vocals (7)
Dave "Taif" Ball – bass (1, 4, 6, 7, 12)
Hugo Degenhardt – drums (1, 4, 6, 7, 12)
Aron Friedman – keyboards (2, 5, 8, 13), programming (2, 5, 8, 13), string arrangements (8)
Nick Magnus – keyboards (9), programming (9)
Bimbo Acock – clarinet (9)
Billy Budis – backing vocals (11)

1993 albums
Steve Hackett albums